Kartal Kayra Yılmaz (born 4 November 2000) is a Turkish professional footballer who plays as a midfielder for Ümraniyespor on loan from Beşiktaş.

Professional career
Yılmaz is a youth product of the academies of KBBKSpor and Beşiktaş. He signed his first professional contract with Beşiktaş when he played in their U19s in 2019. He made his professional debut with them in a 2-1 Europa League loss to S.C. Braga on 24 October 2019. He joined Ümraniyespor on loan for the 2021-22 season in the TFF First League.

References

External links
 
 
 

2000 births
Living people
Sportspeople from İzmit
Turkish footballers
Beşiktaş J.K. footballers
Ümraniyespor footballers
Süper Lig players
TFF First League players
Association football midfielders